Tayru is a village in northwestern Syria, administratively part of the Tartus Governorate, located northeast of Tartus and just east of the Mediterranean town of Baniyas. Nearby localities include Bustan al-Hamam and al-Annazeh to the east, al-Qadmus and Kaff al-Jaa to the southeast, al-Qamsiyah, al-Baydah and Maten al-Sahel to the south. According to the Syria Central Bureau of Statistics, Tayru had a population of 838 in the 2004 census. Its inhabitants are predominantly Alawites.

References

Populated places in Baniyas District
Alawite communities in Syria